Leonardo Bercovici (January 4, 1908, Brooklyn, New York, USA – November 22, 1995, Los Angeles, California, USA) was an American screenwriter, film director and producer.

Blacklisting and aftermath 
Bercovici was called to testify before the House Un-American Activities Committee and blacklisted. He was named by Edward Dmytryk and Richard Collins. On May 16, 1951, he swore he was not a member of the Communist Party, but invoked his fifth amendment right to incriminate himself when he was asked whether he had been a member in the past. He moved to Europe and worked in the European film industry until about 1958, when it was announced he would write the Tyrone Power film Two Against Tomorrow, but Power's death ended the project.

Personal life
Bercovici was married to Frances Ellis; she died in an apparent suicide on May 23, 1951, while Bercovici was being investigated for Communist activities.

Bercovici married Swedish stage and film actress Märta Torén in June 1952; she died in 1957. They had one daughter, Kristina.

His son Eric Bercovici became a screenwriter and producer, as did Bercovici's grandson Luca Bercovici.

Selected credits

Film

Television

Theatre

References

External links

1908 births
1995 deaths
Writers from Brooklyn
Screenwriters from New York (state)
Film directors from New York City
Film directors from Los Angeles
Screenwriters from California
Hollywood blacklist
20th-century American screenwriters